was a town located in Mitsu District, Okayama Prefecture, Japan.

As of 2003, the town had an estimated population of 10,124 and a density of 88.48 persons per km2. The total area was 114.42 km2.

On March 22, 2005, Mitsu, along with the town of Nadasaki (from Kojima District), was merged into the expanded city of Okayama.

Dissolved municipalities of Okayama Prefecture